The 2021 Women's National League, known as the SSE Airtricity WNL for sponsorship reasons, is the 11th season of the Women's National League, the highest women's association football league in the Republic of Ireland since its establishment in 2011. Peamount United were the defending champions, having won their third league title the previous season.

In January 2021 the League attracted a new title sponsor, as SSE Airtricity agreed a two-year renewal of their existing deal with the (men's) League of Ireland and extended it to also cover the WNL. The Bank of Ireland also signed a three-year deal as an associate sponsor of the League of Ireland and WNL. This followed a season without a WNL sponsorship deal in 2020.

The 1,007 spectators at Cork City's 3–1 win over Treaty United on 6 November 2021 at Turners Cross set a new WNL record for the highest attendance.

A dramatic conclusion to the season saw defending champions Peamount United unexpectedly squander a two-goal lead to lose 5–2 at home to Galway on the final match day, allowing Shelbourne to claim the title with their 3–2 win over Wexford Youths. Both matches were subject to live television coverage, following the WNL's agreement of a broadcast arrangement with TG4 in September 2021.

During the season a number of players transferred to professional clubs in England and Scotland. Peamount manager James O'Callaghan called for the formation of a task force, to examine the possibility of making the WNL semi-professional in future: "It's great for those players that they are getting to play professionally, but it's not great for the league to be losing them."

Teams
The same nine teams who had contested the abridged 2020 season returned for 2021.

Personnel and kits

Note: Flags indicate national team as has been defined under FIFA eligibility rules. Players may hold more than one non-FIFA nationality.

Managerial changes

Format
The nine teams play each other three times, with a mid-season break from 7 June to 25 June 2021.

League table

Standings

Positions by round

The table lists the positions of teams after each week of matches. In order to preserve chronological evolvements, any postponed matches are not included to the round at which they were originally scheduled, but added to the full round they were played immediately afterwards.

Results

Matches 1–24
Teams play each other three times, with one team idle on every round of fixtures.

Statistics

Top scorers

Last updated after fixtures on 13 November 2021.

Source: Extratime.com

Awards

Monthly awards

Annual awards

Broadcasting
In February 2021 the Football Association of Ireland announced that all WNL matches would be streamed worldwide, free of charge on the new LOITV platform. In September 2021 the TG4 Irish language television network agreed a deal to broadcast four matches. Alex Kavanagh scored the first televised goal, in Shelbourne's 1–0 win over DLR Waves at Tolka Park. The 309,000 viewing figures exceeded expectations, and TG4 extended the arrangement into the following season.

See also
 2021 FAI Women's Cup

References

External links 
 

Women's National League (Ireland) seasons
Ireland
Ireland
Women
1
1